Acalypha nemorum is a species of flowering plant in the spurge family, Euphorbiaceae. Mostly found growing in rainforests in New South Wales and Queensland, Australia. Usually seen as a shrub, but it may also grow in a prostrate form on headlands beside the ocean.

References

nemorum
Flora of New South Wales
Flora of Queensland